Assin South is one of the constituencies represented in the Parliament of Ghana. It elects one Member of Parliament (MP) by the first past the post system of election. The Assin South constituency is located in the Assin South district of the Central Region of Ghana.

Boundaries
The seat is located entirely within the Assin South district of the Central Region of Ghana.

Members of Parliament

Elections
John Ntim Fordjour, the current MP for the Assin South constituency.

See also
List of Ghana Parliament constituencies
Assin South District

References 

Parliamentary constituencies in the Central Region (Ghana)